The 1985 Yukon general election was held on May 13, 1985 to elect members of the 26th Legislative Assembly of the territory of Yukon, Canada. It was the first Yukon general election with live results coverage on television, and was suspenseful as telecommunications problems prevented the results of the Old Crow riding from being known outside of that community. It was won by the New Democratic Party.

Results by Party

|- style="background:#ccc;"
! rowspan="2" colspan="2" style="text-align:left;"|Party
! rowspan="2" style="text-align:left;"|Party leader
!rowspan="2"|Candidates
! colspan="4" style="text-align:center;"|Seats
!colspan="3" style="text-align:center;"|Popular vote
|- style="background:#ccc;"
| style="text-align:center;"|1982
| style="text-align:center;font-size: 80%;"|Dissol.
| style="text-align:center;"|1985
| style="text-align:center;"|Change
| style="text-align:center;"|#
| style="text-align:center;"|%
| style="text-align:center;"|Change

|align=left|Tony Penikett
|align="right"|16
|align="right"|6
|align="right"|6
|align="right"|8
|align="right"|+2
|align="right"|4,335
|align="right"|41.10%
|align="right"|+5.68%

|align=left|Willard Phelps
|align="right"|16
|align="right"|9
|align="right"|9
|align="right"|6
|align="right"|-3
|align="right"|4,948
|align="right"|46.91%
|align="right"|+1.12%

|align=left|Roger Coles
|align="right"|8
|align="right"|0
|align="right"|0
|align="right"|2
|align="right"|+2
|align="right"|806
|align="right"|7.64%
|align="right"|-7.38%

| colspan="2" style="text-align:left;"|Independent
|align="right"|4
|align="right"|1
|align="right"|1
|align="right"|0
|align="right"|-1
|align="right"|458
|align="right"|4.34%
|align="right"|N/A
|-
| style="text-align:left;" colspan="3"|Total
| style="text-align:right;"|44
| style="text-align:right;"|16
| style="text-align:right;"|16
| style="text-align:right;"|16
| style="text-align:right;"|
| style="text-align:right;"|10,547
| style="text-align:right;"|100.00%
| style="text-align:right;"|
|}

Incumbents not Running for Reelection
The following MLAs had announced that they would not be running in the 1985 election:

New Democratic Party
Maurice Byblow (Faro)

Progressive Conservative
Al Falle (Hootalinqua)
Clarke Ashley (Klondike)
Chris Pearson (Whitehorse Riverdale North)
Kathie Nukon (Old Crow)

Results by Riding
Bold indicates party leaders
† - denotes a retiring incumbent MLA

|-
| style="background:whitesmoke;"|Campbell
|
|Nancy Dieckmann248
|
|
||
|Sam Johnston313
|
|
||
|Dave Porter
|-
| style="background:whitesmoke;"|Faro
|
|Ted Bartsch97
||
|Jim McLachlan142
|
|Sybil Frei121
|
|
||
|Maurice Byblow†
|-
| style="background:whitesmoke;"|Hootalinqua
||
|Willard Phelps461
|
|
|
|Tom Burke399
|
|
||
|Al Falle†
|-
| style="background:whitesmoke;"|Klondike
|
|Helmut Schoener316
|
|
||
|Art Webster375
|
|
||
|Clarke Ashley†
|-
| style="background:whitesmoke;"|Kluane
||
|Bill Brewster237
|
|Tony Stanevicius63
|
|Scott Gilbert95
|
|
||
|Bill Brewster
|-
| style="background:whitesmoke;"|Mayo
|
|Ken Cooper183
|
|Rob Andison18
||
|Piers McDonald251
|
|
||
|Piers McDonald
|-
| style="background:whitesmoke;"|Old Crow
|
|Alice Frost61
|
|
||
|Norma Kassi67
|
|
||
|Kathie Nukon†
|-
| style="background:whitesmoke;"|Tatchun 
|
|Howard Tracey93
||
|Roger Coles159
|
|Victor Mitander131
|
|
||
|Howard Tracey
|-
| style="background:whitesmoke;"|Watson Lake
|
|Don McIntosh90
|
|
||
|Dave Porter183
|
|Don Taylor174Brian Shanahan119
||
|Don Taylor
|-
| style="background:whitesmoke;"|Whitehorse North Centre
|
|Ken McKinnon241
|
|
||
|Margaret Commodore300
|
|George Stalker66
||
|Margaret Commodore
|-
| style="background:whitesmoke;"|Whitehorse Porter Creek East
||
|Dan Lang527
|
|Hans Bierstedt90
|
|Gerry Dobson230
|
|
||
|Dan Lang
|-
| style="background:whitesmoke;"|Whitehorse Porter Creek West
||
|Andy Philipsen393
|
|
|
|Ross Priest280
|
|Frances Nowasad99
||
|Andy Philipsen
|-
| style="background:whitesmoke;"|Whitehorse Riverdale North
||
|Doug Phillips540
|
|Terry Hamilton84
|
|Jim Lockhart268
|
|
||
|Chris Pearson†
|-
| style="background:whitesmoke;"|Whitehorse Riverdale South
||
|Bea Firth627
|
|Willie Harasymow165
|
|Betty Irwin260
|
|
||
|Bea Firth
|-
| style="background:whitesmoke;"|Whitehorse South Centre
|
|Ron Granger303
|
|Arthur Giovinazzo85
||
|Roger Kimmerly346
|
|
||
|Roger Kimmerly
|-
| style="background:whitesmoke;"|Whitehorse West
|
|Charlie Friday531
|
|
||
|Tony Penikett716
|
|
||
|Tony Penikett
|}

References
  (Seats won)

Elections in Yukon
Yukon general election
General election
Yukon general election